Birshreshtha Munshi Abdur Rouf Library and Museum is a museum and library opened on 28 May 2008 in Roufnagar (formerly Salamatpur), Faridpur District, Bangladesh, the home village of Munshi Abdur Rouf, in whose honour it is named. It is one of ten memorial museums opened in 2008 named after the seven Bir Sreshtho recipients and three language martyrs.

References

Museums in Bangladesh
Faridpur District